Poland competed at the 2013 World Aquatics Championships in Barcelona, Spain between 19 July and 4 August 2013.

Medalists

Diving

Poland qualified 2 quota places for the following diving events.

Men

High diving

Poland qualified one quota places for the following high diving event.

Swimming

Polish swimmers earned qualifying standards in the following events (up to a maximum of 2 swimmers in each event at the A-standard entry time, and 1 at the B-standard):

Men

Women

References

External links
Polish Swimming Federation 
Barcelona 2013 Official Site

Nations at the 2013 World Aquatics Championships
2013 in Polish sport
Poland at the World Aquatics Championships